Alfred Eliab Buck (February 7, 1832 – December 4, 1902) was a U.S. Representative from Alabama.

Biography
Born in Foxcroft, Maine, Buck graduated from Waterville College (now Colby College) in 1859.  On his twentieth birthday he wrote that he supported "immediate emancipation" rather than "gradual emancipation" for enslaved African-Americans in the southern states.  He stated that "the slavery interest is simply too dug in for a gradual process...if such a process were to begin, it would have had to have done so over forty or fifty years ago."  He outspokenly praised the efforts of "radical abolitionists" such as the Boston Vigilance Committee and the Massachusetts Anti-Slavery Society.  Buck was outspoken about the "heinous abduction" of Anthony Burns from Boston. During the Civil War he entered the Union Army as captain of Company C, Thirteenth Regiment, Maine Volunteer Infantry. He was appointed lieutenant colonel of the Ninety-first United States Colored Troops in August 1863, was transferred to the Fifty-first United States Colored Troops in October 1864, and was made brevetted colonel of Volunteers for gallant conduct. He was mustered out of the service at Baton Rouge, Louisiana, in June 1866.  He began to work in southern Alabama as an officer of the Freedmen's Bureau. He then served as delegate to the constitutional convention of Alabama in 1867, and as clerk of the circuit court of Mobile County in 1867 and 1868.   Alfred Buck moved his family to Mobile, where he became involved in the manufacture of turpentine on Montgomery Island in Mobile until a fire destroyed his business in 1867. He also entered into the iron-smelting business with his brother-in-law, William B. Wood, who would later serve on the U.S. Supreme Court from 1881 to 1887.

Buck ran for Congress in 1868, to represent Alabama's 1st District, which at the time included both Selma and Mobile. Due to the laws of the reconstruction government, most people who fought for the confederacy were not eligible to vote in that election.  As a result, a large majority of the voters in that election were newly freed African-Americans.  Local whites were furious at the prospect of being outvoted by African-Americans and the local Ku Klux Klan was formed in an attempt to prevent voting in Alabama's first district congressional election.  However, the United States Army occupied the area in enough force to prevent the Klan from disrupting that particular election.  As a result, Buck won the election.  
Buck was elected as a Republican to the Forty-first Congress (March 4, 1869 – March 3, 1871).  During this time Buck believed going into business would be both more lucrative and more fulfilling, so he did not seek re-election to congress.  During his time as a Congressman he was labeled as a "Radical Republican", a label he said he "wore with pride".  Instead of Buck running for re-election, Benjamin S. Turner would run to represent Alabama's first district, Buck endorsed Turner and campaigned for him in Mobile. Buck was later appointed president of the city council of Mobile in 1873. He served as clerk of the United States circuit and district courts in Atlanta, Georgia from 1874 to 1889. He was later appointed United States marshal for the northern district of Georgia 1889-1893 by President Benjamin Harrison.

In 1896, Buck was the leader of the Georgia Republican Party. Buck was the president of the Republican State Convention in late April and presided over the electing of delegates to the 1896 Republican National Convention. There was dispute over the delegates, which Buck attempted to preempt by passing a "harmony" slate of delegates outside of standard procedure. However, the slate did not include Emanuel K. Love's friend, Richard R. Wright, who many believed would be a delegate. The convention erupted in protest and a representative of Buck's attempted to adjourn the meeting and the Buck faction left the hall. The Love and Wright faction remained and Love took the chair, electing a new slate of delegates, now including Love (and Buck but still not Wright). Eventually Buck was a delegate and Wright attended as an alternate.

He was appointed Minister to Japan by President William McKinley in April 1897 and served until his death in Tokyo, Japan, on December 4, 1902. He was interred in Arlington National Cemetery.

See also

References
 Retrieved on February 14, 2008

External links

1832 births
1902 deaths
Union Army colonels
Ambassadors of the United States to Japan
United States Marshals
People of Maine in the American Civil War
People from Dover-Foxcroft, Maine
Burials at Arlington National Cemetery
Colby College alumni
Republican Party members of the United States House of Representatives from Alabama
19th-century American politicians
19th-century American diplomats
20th-century American diplomats